is a train station in Nichinan, Miyazaki Prefecture, Japan.

Lines

Layout 
The station consists of a side platform serving a single track at grade. There is no station building, only a shelter on the platform for waiting passengers. A bike shed has been set up at the station forecourt, from where a short flight of steps leads up to the platform.

Adjacent stations

History
The line was then extended northwards in phases, reaching  by 1937. The track was extended further north with Kitagō opening as the northern terminus on 28 October 1941. Uchinoda was one of several intermediate stations opened on the same day on the new track. The route was designated the Nichinan Line on 8 May 1963. With the privatization of JNR on 1 April 1987, the station came under the control of JR Kyushu.

Passenger statistics
In fiscal 2016, the station was used by an average of 10 passengers (boarding only) per day.

See also
List of railway stations in Japan

References

External links
Uchinoda (JR Kyushu)

Railway stations in Miyazaki Prefecture
Railway stations in Japan opened in 1941